The Convair CV-240 is an American airliner that Convair manufactured from 1947 to 1954, initially as a possible replacement for the ubiquitous Douglas DC-3. Featuring a more modern design with cabin pressurization, the 240 series made some inroads as a commercial airliner, and had a long development cycle that produced various civil and military variants. Though reduced in numbers by attrition, various forms of the "Convairliners" continue to fly in the 21st century.

Design and development
The design began with a requirement by American Airlines for an airliner to replace its Douglas DC-3s. Convair's original design, the unpressurised Model 110, was a twin-engine, low-wing monoplane of all-metal construction, with 30 seats. It was powered by Pratt & Whitney R-2800 Double Wasp radial engines. It had a tricycle landing gear, and a ventral airstair for passenger boarding. The prototype Model 110, registration NX90653, first flew on July 8, 1946. By this time, American Airlines had changed the requirements to include pressurization and deemed the design too small. Convair used the first prototype for 240 series development work before it had the plane broken up in 1947.

To meet the requirements of airlines for a pressurized airliner, Convair produced a revised design—the Model 240. This had a longer but thinner fuselage than the Model 110, accommodating 40 passengers in the first pressurized, twin-engined airliner. The 240 first flew on March 16, 1947.

The Model 240 was followed by the Model 340, which had a longer fuselage, longer-span wings, and more powerful engines. The 340 first flew on October 5, 1951. In 1954, in an attempt to compete with turboprop-powered airliners such as the Vickers Viscount, Convair produced the Model 440 Metropolitan, with more streamlined cowlings, new engine exhausts, and better cabin soundproofing. As the "Super 240" evolved into the CV-340 and CV-440, the design reached the limit of piston-engine performance, and future development centered on conversion to turboprop power.

Operational history
Convair delivered the first production Convairliner to American on February 29, 1948. They delivered a total of 75 to American—and another 50 to Western Airlines, Continental Airlines, Pan American Airways, Lufthansa, KLM, Swissair, Sabena, and Trans Australia Airlines.

A CV-240 was the first private aircraft used in a United States presidential campaign. In 1960, John F. Kennedy used a CV-240 named Caroline (after his daughter) during his campaign. This aircraft is now preserved in the National Air and Space Museum.

After aborted negotiations with TWA and Eastern for "Super 240" orders, Convair temporarily halted 240 series production. In response to a United inquiry, Convair redesigned the Super 240, calling it the CV-340. United ordered 55, and more US orders came from Braniff, Continental, Delta, Northeast, and National. Other orders came from abroad, and the CV-340 was popular in South America. The CV-340 earned a reputation for reliability and profitability, and was developed into the CV-440 Metropolitan, the final piston-engined variant of the Convairliners.

Kelowna Flightcraft Air Charter, the major remaining operator of this model, currently holds the type certificate for this aircraft.

Used price for a Convair 240 in 1960 was around £40,000.

Variants
Data from: General Dynamics Aircraft and their predecessors

Civil variants

Convair Model 110
Unpressurized prototype with seats for 30 passengers. 89 ft (27.13 m) wingspan, 71 ft (21.64 m) length, powered by two 2,100 hp (1,567 kW) Pratt & Whitney R-2800-SC13G engines. One built.
Convair CV-240
Initial production version, with seats for 40 passengers in a pressurised fuselage. Powered by two Pratt & Whitney  R-2800 engines. 176 built (excluding military derivatives).
Convair CV-240-21 Turboliner
Turboprop-powered conversion fitted with Allison T38 engines. It became the first turboprop airliner to fly in the United States (on December 29, 1950), but problems with the engines resulted in development being terminated. Used as a test bed before being converted back to piston power.
Convair CV-300
 A conversion from a Convair CV-240 with two R-2800 CB-17 engines and nacelles as used on the CV-340.

Built for United Airlines and other operators including KLM, the CV-340 was a CV-240 lengthened to hold an additional four seats. The wingspan was extended for better performance at higher altitudes. The CV-340 replaced the DC-3 in United service. The airline flew 52 340s for 16 years without a fatality. KLM operated the type from early 1953 until mid-1963. Many CV-340 aircraft were converted to CV-440 standard.

CV-340 with improved soundproofing and an option for weather radar. Maximum weight rose to 49,700 lbs. An optional increase from 44 to 52 passengers was facilitated by the replacement of the carry-on luggage area with two more rows of seats, marked by the addition of an extra cabin window. This option was taken up by several airlines including Swissair, Lufthansa and SAS. Finnair operated the type from 1953 until 1980.
Convair CV-540
Conversion from a Convair CV-340 aircraft with two Napier Eland turboprop engines in place of the piston engines. Six aircraft were converted by Napier for Allegheny Airlines. Cost for the conversions was £160,000 per-aircraft. 12 built as new-builds by Canadair for RCAF as CC-109 in 1960 for £436,000 per-aircraft. First flight February 9, 1955. When Rolls-Royce purchased Napier, the Eland program was terminated, and the Allegheny aircraft were converted back to piston power, but were later converted to Convair 580s with Allison turbo props.

Conversion from Convair CV-340 (Allison Prop-Jet Convair 340) or CV-440 aircraft with two Allison 501 D13D/H turboprop engines with four-blade propellers, in place of piston engines with three-blade propellers, an enlarged vertical fin and modified horizontal stabilizers. The conversions were performed by Pacific Airmotive on behalf of the Allison Engine Company. Cost of the conversions was around £175,000 per aircraft and took 60 days.  The CV-580 served with the original Frontier Airlines (1950-1986), Allegheny Airlines, and North Central Airlines for many years and was also the first aircraft type operated by American Eagle on behalf of American Airlines in code sharing feeder service.  General Motors Air Transport (GMATs) also used CV-580's on their internal air shuttle operation which ran between Detroit Metro Airport, Dayton,OH, Anderson, IN and other locations as needed.
Convair CV-580 Airtanker
 Firefighting airtanker conversions with retardant tanks and dropping systems.
Convair CV-600
Conversion from a Convair 240 aircraft with Rolls-Royce Dart turboprop engines with four-blade propellers, in place of piston engines with three-blade propellers. CV-600 conversions were performed by Convair. The CV-600 first flew with Central Airlines on 30 November 1965 and also served with Trans-Texas Airways (TTa) and successor Texas International Airlines for many years. The CV-600 aircraft that flew with Air Metro Airways was configured as a 40-passenger airliner. In 2012 the last Convair CV-600 (Rhoades Aviation) went out of service.
Convair CV-640
Conversion from a Convair CV-340 or -440 with Rolls-Royce Dart turboprop engines with four-blade propellers, in place of piston engines with three-blade propellers. The conversions were performed by Convair. In 2012, a total of seven Convair CV-640 aircraft remained in airline service, with Rhoades Aviation (one) and C&M Airways (six).
Convair CV-5800

A stretched Convair CV-5800 of IFL Group with this aircraft being developed by Kelowna Flightcraft (now KF Aerospace) in Canada
Conversion from former US Navy C-131F Samaritans by Kelowna Flightcraft Ltd. (KF Aerospace since 2015) in Canada. The CV-5800 is a C-131F Samaritan stretched by 16 ft 7 in (4,98 m) with the Samaritan's original tail unit rather than the enlarged tail of the CV-580. These conversions also have a new freight door, digital avionics with EFIS and Allison 501-D22G engines in place of the original R-2800 engines. The prototype of this conversion first flew on February 11, 1992; the type certificate was issued on December 11, 1993. A total of six aircraft were converted (construction numbers 276 to 279, 309, 343) and mostly used by Contract Air Cargo (later IFL Group); one aircraft later operated by Air Freight NZ was then returned to KF Aerospace for operation in their own fleet.
Allison Turbine ATF 580S Turbo Flagship
Stretched Convairliner conversion.

Military variants
Convair C-131 Samaritan
The CV-240/340/440 series was used by the United States Air Force for medical evacuation and VIP under this designation
Convair T-29 trainer
A trainer model of the C-131 was used to instruct navigators and radio operators
Convair R4Y Samaritan
The United States Navy used the Samaritan under this designation
Canadair CC-109 Cosmopolitan
Conversion from CV-440, with Napier Eland turboprops in place of the piston engines. The conversions were performed in Canada by Canadair. In Royal Canadian Air Force and later in Canadian Armed Forces service they were known as the CC-109 Cosmopolitan. All were re-engined in 1966 with Allison 501-D13 engines.
Canadair CL-66
Company designation for the CC-109 Eland powered variant

Operators

Civil operators

Africa 
 Air Algerie – CV-640
 Ethiopian Air Lines – CV-240
 Kardair (Libya) – CV-440
 Titan Helicopter Group (South Africa) – 3 CV-580
 Regional Air (South Africa – 2 CV-580)
 Rovos Air (South Africa – CV-340)

Asia 
 Air Jordan – CV-240
 Air Maldives – CV-440
 All Nippon Airways – CV-440
 Ariana Afghan Airlines – CV-340
  (CATC), - 6 CV-240
 Garuda Indonesia – CV-240, CV-340 & CV-440
 Iran Air  – CV-240
 Japan Domestic Airlines – CV-240
 Orient Airways CV-240
 Pakistan International Airlines – CV-240
 Philippine Airlines – CV-340
 Royal Air Cambodge – CV-440
 Saudi Arabian Airlines – CV-340
 Seulawah Air Services – CV-640
 South East Asia Air Transport – CV-340
 Toa Airways

Oceania 
 Air Chathams – CV-580
 Air Fiji – CV-580
 Air Freight NZ – CV-580 & CV-5800
 Airlines of New South Wales – CV-440
 Airlines of South Australia – CV-440
 Ansett Airlines – CV-340, CV-440 (some were formerly operated by Braniff International Airways)
 Chathams Pacific – CV-580
 Pionair – CV-580
 Real Tonga – CV-580
 Trans Australia Airlines – CV-240

Europe 

 Aviaco – CV-440
 Alitalia – Linee Aeree Italiane – , CV-340 & CV-440
 Condor (& predecessor Deutsche Flugdienst) –  & CV-440
 Delta Air Transport – CV-440
 European Air Transport – CV-580
 Finnair – CV-340 & CV-440
 Fred Olsen Air Transport – CV-340
 General Air (Germany) – CV-440
 Iberia Airlines – Convair CV-440
 JAT Yugoslav Airlines – CV-340 & CV-440
 Kar-Air CV-440
 KLM – CV-240 & CV-340
 Linjeflyg – CV-340 & CV-440
 LOT Polish Airlines – CV-240 (5 in 1957–1966)
 Lufthansa – CV-340 & CV-440
 Martinair – CV-640
 Mey-Air – CV-240
 Nor-Fly Charter – CV-440 & CV-580
 Pan Adria Airways CV-440
 Partnair – CV-580
  – CV-240
 SABENA – CV-240 & CV-440
 SAS – CV-440
 SATA, SA de Transport Aérien – CV-440 & CV-640
 Stellar Airfreighter (Norway) – CV-440
 Swiftair – CV-580
 Swissair – CV-240 & CV-440
 Tellair – CV-440

United States and Canada 
 Air Mid-America – CV-600
 Air New England – CV-580
 Air Ontario – CV-580
 Air Rajneesh – CV-440
 Air Resorts – CV-440
 Air Tahoma – CV-240 & CV-580
 Allegheny Airlines - , CV-540 & CV-580
 Alaska Airlines – CV-240
 American Airlines – CV-240
 American Eagle – See Metro Airlines
 American Inter-Island – CV-440 (wholly owned subsidiary of American Airlines, which operated flights between San Juan, St. Thomas and St. Croix in the Caribbean)
 Aspen Airways – CV-240, CV-440 & CV-580
 Atlantic Gulf Airlines – CV-580
 Bar Harbor Airlines – CV-600
 Braniff International Airways – CV-340 & CV-440
 Buffalo Airways – CV-240 bought for its engines, not put in service
 Cal Sierra Airlines – CV-580
 Canadian Pacific Airlines – CV-240
 Caribair (Puerto Rico) – CV-340, CV-440 & CV-640
 Central Airlines – CV-240 & CV-600
 Charter Airlines – CV-580
 Cochise Airlines – CV-440
 Conair Group – CV-580
 Continental Airlines – CV-240, CV-340 & CV-440
 Continental Express – CV-580 (operated by Trans-Colorado Airlines)
  Cordova Airlines – CV-240 (acquired by and merged into Alaska Airlines)
 Delta Air Lines – CV-340 & CV-440
 Desert Air – CV-240
 Eastern Air Lines – CV-440
 Era Aviation – CV-580
 Executive Airlines – CV-440
 Freedom Airlines – CV-580
 Frontier Airlines (1950–1986) – CV-240, CV-340, CV-440, CV-580 & CV-600 (CV-600 aircraft formerly operated by Central Airlines)
 Great Lakes Airlines (Canada) – CV-440 & CV-580
 Gulf Air Transport – CV-340, CV-440 & CV-580 (U.S. charter air carrier. CV-580 aircraft were formerly operated by North Central and Republic.)
 Harrison Airways (Canada) – CV-440
 Hawaiian Airlines – CV-340, CV-440 & CV-640
 IFL Group – CV-580 & CV-5800
 Kelowna Flightcraft Air Charter (KF Aerospace) – CV-580 & CV-5800
 Kitty Hawk Aircargo – Convair CV-240, CV-340, CV-440, CV-600 and CV-640
 L&J Company of Addison, Texas – CV-240 (aircraft tragically crashed with the band Lynyrd Skynyrd on board)
 Lake Central Airlines – CV-340 & CV-580
 Laredo Air – CV-580
 Mackey Airlines (also known as Mackey International) – CV-440 & CV-580
 Metro Airlines (via its wholly owned Metroflight division) – CV-580 (former Frontier Airlines aircraft that were operated for American Eagle via agreement with American Airlines)
 Miami Air Lease – CV-440
 Midwest Air Charter/Airborne Express – CV-600
 Mohawk Airlines – CV-240 & CV-440
 National Airlines – CV-340 & CV-440
 Nolinor Aviation – CV-580
 Norcanair – CV-580 & CV-640
 Nordair (Nordair Metro division) – CV-580
 North Central Airlines – CV-580
 Northeast Airlines – CV-240
 Northwest Airlines – CV-580 (former Republic Airlines aircraft that were previously operated by North Central Airlines)
 Pacific Western Airlines – CV-640
 Pan American World Airways (Pan Am) – CV-240 & CV-340
 Powell Air – CV-440
 Quebecair – CV-540 (CL-66)
 Renown Aviation – CV-440 & CV-580
 Republic Airlines – CV-580 (formerly operated by North Central Airlines)
 Resort Air Commuter – CV-580
 Rhoades Aviation – CV-640
 Sea Airmotive – CV-340, CV-440 & CV-580
 Sierra Pacific Airlines – CV-340, CV-440 & CV-580
  Skyfreighters – CV-440
 SMB Stage Lines – CV-600 & CV-640
 Summit Airlines – CV-580
 Sun Valley Key Airlines – CV-440 (U.S. commuter air carrier previously known as Sun Valley Airlines, which operated out of Salt Lake City, UT and Sun Valley, ID, and then changed its name back to Key Airlines)
 Trans-Texas Airways (TTa) – CV-240 & CV-600
 Texas International Airlines – CV-600 (former Trans-Texas Airways aircraft)
 Time Air – CV-580 & CV-640 (former Norcan Air and North Caribou, also one previously owned by Domino's Pizza)
 Trans-Colorado Airlines – CV-580 (aircraft painted in the livery of Continental Express)
 United Airlines – CV-340 & CV-580 (CV-580 aircraft operated via wet lease contract by Frontier Airlines (1950–1986) as the replacement for former United Douglas DC-6 service to Elko, NV and Ely, NV)
 Viking International Airlines – CV-600 & CV-640
 Westates Airlines – CV-580
 Western Airlines – CV-240
 Wright Airlines – CV-440, CV-600 & CV-640
 Zantop International Airlines – Convair 640

Mexico, the Caribbean, Central and South America 
 Aero California – CV-340
 Aerocaribe – CV-340 & CV-440
 Aerolíneas Argentinas – CV-240
 Aerolineas Colonia (Uruguay) – CV-240
 Aeromexico – CV-340
 Aeroquetzal – CV-580
 ALM Antillean Airlines – CV-340 & CV-440
 Arawak Airlines (Trinidad and Tobago) CV-440
 ARCO Aerolíneas Colonia S.A. (Uruguay) – CV-240, CV-600
 Avensa – CV-240, CV-340, CV-580
 Aviateca – CV-240, CV-340 & CV-440
 Caribair (Puerto Rico) – see North America
 Chilean Airways – CV-580
 COPA Compañia Panameña de Aviación – CV-340
 Cruzeiro do Sul – CV-240, CV-340 & CV-440
  (FAMA)
 LACSA – CV-340 & CV-440
 Líneas Aéreas Paraguayas (LAP) – 3 CV-240
 LAN Chile – CV-440
 Prinair – CV-580
 Real Transportes Aéreos – CV-340 & CV-440
 SAHSA – CV-580
 Transportes Aéreos Nacional – CV-440
 VARIG – CV-240, CV-340 & CV-440

Military operators
 
 Royal Australian Air Force - Two CV-440 Metropolitans (RAAF serial A95-313 and 353) were in service with RAAF from 1956 to 1968.
 No. 34 Squadron RAAF
 
 Transporte Aéreo Militar - Six CV-440s and five CV-580s acquired. One of each remaining as of 1987.
 
 Royal Canadian Air Force and Canadian Armed Forces CV-540s were re engined with T56 turbo props with 412 Squadron
  CV-580
 
 Luftwaffe operated six CV-440s.
 
 Italian Air Force operated four CV-440 Metropolitans from 1957 until 1978
 
 Paraguayan Air Force: CV-440/C-131D
 
 Sri Lanka Air Force - CV-440
 
 Mexican Air Force CV-580 Nowadays used as an AEW&C Simulator on AFB #1 Santa Lucia

Other operators

 
 National Research Council (Canada) (CV-580 C-FNRC) multi purpose flying laboratory, mainly used for airborne atmospheric research, carrying more than 40 in-situ sensors and cloud probes and remote sensing instrumentation such as X,W band radars, 355 nm lidars, and radiometers.

 Canada Centre for Remote Sensing, later Environment Canada, retired to the Canada Aviation and Space Museum in June 2015 in recognition of its historical significance to Canadian science (CV-580 C-GRSC)
 
 CAAC - One CATC CV-240 defected to the People's Republic in November 1949. This may have been used as a VIP aircraft.  
 
 Airborne Resources, (C-131B N131CR)
 Environmental Research Institute of Michigan, later Veridian and then General Dynamics Advanced Information Systems (CV-580s N51211) and N51255)
 Honeywell International, Everett Washington (CV-580 N580HW)
 Raytheon, Tucson Arizona (CV-580 N580HH)
 University of Washington, (CV-580 N3UW)

Accidents and incidents

Specifications (CV-240)

See also

References

Notes

Bibliography
 Best, Martin S. "The Development of Commercial Aviation in China: Part 8A: Central Air Transport Corporation". Air Britain Archive, Summer 2009. pp. 75–92. .
 Best, Martin S. "The Development of Commercial Aviation in China: Part 8B: Central Air Transport Corporation - Fleet Lists". Air Britain Archive, Autumn 2009. pp. 103–118. 
 Best, Martin S. "The Development of Commercial Aviation in China: Part 14: Civil Aviation Administration of China". Air Britain Archive, Winter 2011. pp. 153–171. 
 Best, Martin S. "The Development of Commercial Aviation in China: Part 14: Civil Aviation Administration of China". Air Britain Archive, Winter 2011. pp. 153–171. 
 Best, Martin S. "The Development of Commercial Aviation in China: Part 14B: Civil Aviation Administration of China". Air Britain Archive, Spring 2012. pp. 15–28. 
 Bridgman, Leonard (ed.) Jane's All the World's Aircraft 1955–56. New York: The McGraw-Hill Book Company, Inc. 
 "Commercial Aircraft of the World". Flight, November 18, 1960. Vol. 78, No. 2697. pp. 781–827. .
 "Complete Civil Registers: 7: Ethiopia ET: Part Two". Archive. 1996, No. 3. Air-Britain Historians. pp. 63–68. .
 Frawley, Gerald. "Convair CV-540, 580, 600, 640 & CV5800". The International Directory of Civil Aircraft 1997/98. Fyshwick ACT, Aerospace Publications, 199, p. 86 .
 Gradidge, Jennifer. The Convairliners Story. Tonbridge, Kent, UK: Air-Britain (Historians) Ltd., First edition, 1997, .
 Hagby, Kay . Fra Nielsen & Winther til Boeing 747.  Drammen, Norway. Hagby, 1998.  .
 Lambert, Mark. Jane's All the World's Aircraft 1993–94. Coulsdon, UK: Jane's Data Division, 1993. .
 Siegrist, Martin. "Bolivian Air Power — Seventy Years On". Air International, Vol. 33, No. 4, October 1987. pp. 170–176, 194. .
 Veronico, Nicholas A. & Larkins, William T. Convair Twins: Piston Convair-Liners: Prop-Jet Turbo Liners. Airliner Tech Series, Volume 12. North Branch, Minnesota: Speciality Press Publishers, 2005. .
 Wegg, John. General Dynamics Aircraft and their Predecessors. London: Putnam & Company Ltd., 1990. .
 Wragg, David W. World's Air Fleets. London: Ian Allan, 2nd edition, 1969. .
 "World Airline Directory". Flight, April 8, 1960, Vol. 77, No. 2665. pp. 484–516. .

External links

 Convair CV-240, National Air and Space Museum
 C-131 Samaritan factsheet, National Museum of the United States Air Force
 C-131D Samaritan, March Field Air Museum
 C-131 Samaritan
 C-131 Samaritan, The Aviation Zone
 Gunships, The Aviation Zone
 BBC News Article about Convair CV-440
 Aero News Network Article about Convair CV-440
Canadian Research Facilities Navigator: NRC Flight Research Laboratory Convair-580 aircraft

CV-240
1940s United States airliners
1950s United States airliners
Low-wing aircraft
Aircraft first flown in 1947
Twin piston-engined tractor aircraft